Rene Hardenbol, OAM (born 17 May 1971)  is an Australian swimmer with an intellectual disability. At the 1992 Paralympic Games for Persons with Mental Handicap, he won five gold medals and two silver medals.

Personal

He was born on  17 May 1971 in Western Australia. At the age of 12 months, he was diagnosed with behavioural autism. In January 1983, his parents sent him to live in the Netherlands with his maternal grandmother and to attend the De Zevens-sprong School for children with special needs. Whilst in the Netherlands he was encouraged to take up swimming.

Swimming career

At age 13, after he returned to Australia,  he  was coached by Barbara Evans  at the Aqua Club between 1984 and 1985.  before joining the Aqua Club of which he was made a life member in 1994. From 1986, he was coached by George Brown at the Victoria Park/Carlisle Swimming Club. In 1988, he won three gold and a silver medal at the Special Olympic Games in Sydney, New South Wales. At the 1st World Games for Athletes with an Intellectual Disability in Härnösand, Sweden,  he won three gold, two silver and five bronze medals. He set world record times in the 400m freestyle, 200m freestyle and 200m backstroke.

At the 1992 Paralympic Games for Persons with Mental Handicap, Madrid, Spain, he won five gold  medals in the Men's 200 m Backstroke, Men's 4 x 50 m Freestyle Relay, Men's 4 × 100 m Freestyle Relay, Men's 4 x 50 m Medley Relay, Men's 4 × 100 m Medley Relay and two silver medals in the Men's 100 m Freestyle and Men's 200 m Breaststroke.
He set a world record in the 200m Backstroke. After the Games, he was offered an Australian Institute of Sport Athlete with a Disability scholarship.

He competed at the 1994 IPC Swimming World Championships in Malta and won three gold medals in the Men's 50m Backstroke S14, Men's 50m Breaststroke SB14, Men's 50m Freestyle S14 and a silver medal in the Men's 100 m Freestyle S14. He retired from Paralympic swimming at the end of 1994.

In 2014, he is a member of the Somerset Masters Swimming Club.  He has also been a member of a four-person team who successfully completed the Rottnest Channel Swim.

Recognition
1989 - Comment News Senior Sports Star of the Year
1991 - City of Gosnells Certificate of Merit for Meritorious Achievement in the field of Swimming
1993 - OAM for service to sport as a gold medallist at the Madrid 1992 Paralympic Games.
1994 - Caltex Sports Person of the Year, Special Olympics category
2000 - Australian Sports Medal
2014 - Victoria Park Sporting Walk of Fame

References

1971 births
Australian male breaststroke swimmers
Intellectual Disability category Paralympic competitors
Australian Institute of Sport Paralympic swimmers
Recipients of the Medal of the Order of Australia
Recipients of the Australian Sports Medal
Swimmers from Perth, Western Australia
Living people
Sportspeople with intellectual disability
Australian male freestyle swimmers
Australian male backstroke swimmers
20th-century Australian people